The Council of Labor and Defense (Russian: Совет труда и обороны (СТО) Sovet Truda i Oborony, Latin acronym: STO), first established as the Council of Workers' and Peasants' Defense in November 1918, was an agency responsible for the central management of the  economy and production of military materiel in the Russian Socialist Federative Soviet Republic and later in the Soviet Union. During the Russian Civil War of 1917-1922 the council served as an emergency "national economic cabinet", issuing emergency decrees in an effort to sustain industrial production for the Red Army amidst economic collapse. In 1920–23 it existed on the rights of the commission of the Russian Sovnarkom and after 1923 of the  Soviet Council of People's Commissariats. The Central Executive Committee of the Soviet Union abolished the Council on 28 April 1937.

The chairperson of the Council ex officio was a chairperson of the Council of People's Commissars. The STO, a commission of the Council of People's Commissars, included among its executive body such top-ranking Bolshevik leaders as V. I. Lenin, Leon Trotsky, and Joseph Stalin, who oversaw a burgeoning professional apparatus. In March 1920 the Council of Workers' and Peasants' Defense became the Council of Labour and Defense. Following the formation of the USSR in 1922 the Council was renamed in 1923 as the Council of Labour and Defense of the USSR; its economic planning and regulatory roles expanded to encompass the entire country. As the first central  economic-planning authority in Soviet Russia, the Council of Labor and Defense served as the institutional precursor to the better-known Soviet planning-authority of later years, Gosplan, launched in August 1923 as a subcommittee of STO.

History

Economic background

The Russian Revolution of 1917 concluded in the fall with the October Revolution, organized and achieved through the direction of V. I. Lenin's radical Bolshevik faction of the Russian Social Democratic Labor Party. With the country already decimated and disorganized by three brutal years of the First World War, the fledgling socialist state struggled to hang on and survive civil war, a multinational foreign military intervention, and the collapse of the economy, including the broad depopulation of major cities and the onset of hyperinflation.

The revolutionary government faced the dual tasks of economic organization and the marshaling of material resources on behalf of its Red Army. A new body known as the Supreme Council of National Economy (Latin acronym of the Cyrillic: VSNKh, commonly sounded out as "Vesenkha") was established on December 15, 1917 as the first governmental entity for the coordination of state finance and economic production and distribution in the Russian Socialist Federative Soviet Republic (RSFSR). Vesenkha was attached to the de facto cabinet of the RSFSR, the Council of People's Commissars, and formally answered to that body.

As the Vesenkha bureaucracy developed, it began to generate specialized departments from itself, entities known as glavki, each responsible for the operation of a specific economic sector. These subordinate entities were known by descriptive syllabic abbreviations, such as for example, Tsentrotextil''' for the central department in charge of textile production, and Glavneft and Glavles for the central departments in charge of oil and timber, respectively. These organizations frequently corresponded to economic syndicates established prior to the war and taken over by the pre-revolutionary Tsarist government as part of its coordination of the economy for its own war effort. The personnel employed in these glavki were often the same individuals who served in a similar capacity under the old regime.

Although there were fewer than 500 nationalized companies prior to June 1918, by the end of that month the intensification of the Civil War and worsening economic situation led to adoption of a decree nationalizing all factories of the nation. Goods of all kinds vanished from the marketplace and rationing was extended. Unable to receive fair value for their surplus grain from the state grain-purchasing monopoly, peasants withheld their production from the official market, causing a parallel black market to emerge. The state's prodrazverstka, involving the systemic use of force against the peasantry in order to requisition grain further deepened the crisis. This new centralized and coercive economy, brought about by economic collapse and the exigencies of civil war is remembered to economic historians as Military Communism.

Establishment

In the absence of a viable market economy, the Soviet state needed a mechanism for the coordination of production and distribution to serve the direct needs of the military. On November 30, 1918 the All-Russian Central Executive Committee (executive authority of the Congress of Soviets) created a bureaucratic entity designed for this purpose, initially called the Council of Workers' and Peasants' Defense. This bureau was presented with the task of gathering and disbursing resources needed for the war effort.

The Council of Workers' and Peasants' Defense was originally conceived as an emergency body dedicated solely to the mobilization of Russia's resources for the fighting of the civil war. Lenin himself was named as chairman, Leon Trotsky sat as the People's Commissar of War, Leonid Krassin as head of the extraordinary commission of supply, and Joseph Stalin as the representative of the All-Russian Executive Committee. 

The organization quickly emerged as what historian Alec Nove has called the "effective economic cabinet" of the nation, with the power to issue legally binding decrees. For the duration of the civil war, running up to early 1921, the Council of Workers' and Peasants' Defense existed as an ad hoc basis, issuing its decrees on the basis that a national emergency existed and largely unconcerned with long-term planning processes. The council instead concentrated upon day-to-day exigencies related to the life or death military campaign.

As was the case with the parallel government planning organization Vesenkha and its glavki, the Council of Workers' and Peasants' Defense had a set of specialized subcommittees dedicated to specific aspects of the military industries. In many cases the two organizations attempted to extend their own influence and agendas within the same industries. Productive industry remained in crisis as authorities threw manpower and resources from one critical bottleneck to the next, creating new shortages in the process of attempting to solve standing problems.

From 1919 the authority of Vesenkha began to wane, with the People's Commissariat of Agriculture (Narkomprod) in charge of grain requisitions and the Council of Workers' and Peasants' Defense gaining power in the industrial sphere. The mobilization of unskilled labor, including labor service by peasants demanded by local government authorities for the transport of fuel, food, and military supplies, was made the province of the People's Commissariat of Labor (Narkomtrud). Vesenkha was reduced to one of several central economic authorities, and by no means the superior.

One beneficiary of the institutional atrophy experience by Vesenkha was the Council of Workers' and Peasants' Defense. The authority of the organization was bolstered n the summer of 1919 by the appointment of top-ranking Bolshevik Alexei Rykov as the "extraordinary representative," further accentuating the place of the organization as first among equals in the planning firmament. For the duration of the civil war a large percentage of the output of Soviet industry would be dedicated to the needs of the Red Army, the supply of which was characterized as "the cornerstone of our economic policy" by one leading economic official. The Council of Workers' and Peasants' Defense was given charge of all supplies to the Red Army except for agricultural products and was the primary controller and user of the nation's industrial output, limited though it may have been.

New name, new role

With the civil war drawing to a successful finish, in March 1920 the council was given a new name — Sovet truda i oborony (STO), the Council of Labor and Defense. The organization was formally recognized as being of higher priority than its bureaucratic rival Vesenkha in obtaining allocations of scarce resources. Rather than limiting itself to the industrial production and allocation necessary for the Red Army in wartime, STO took a broader approach to planning than it had in its earlier iteration.

The new name and function of STO was ratified in December 1920 by the 8th All-Russian Congress of Soviets, the formal legislative authority of Soviet Russia. STO was recognized as a commission of the Council of People's Commissars (Sovnarkom), to be headed by the leading People's Commissars themselves, a representative of the Russian trade unions, and the chief of the Central Statistical Agency. STO was directed to establish a single economic plan for Soviet Russia, to direct the work of the individual People's Commissariats toward this plan's fulfillment, and to issue exceptions to the plan as necessary, among other functions. In this way "for the first time the RSFSR had a general planning organ with clearly defined functions," historian E. H. Carr has observed.

During the market-based New Economic Policy (NEP) which followed the wartime economy of Military Communism, STO emerged as an apparatus of administrative control, coordinating the formation of "special unions" of firms in a given branch of industry on the basis of self-financing (khozraschët) and greenlighting the separation of individual firms from centralized trusts on the same basis.

An effort was made in May 1922 to make STO the regulating agency for national trade when Sovnarkom created a new commission attached to STO with the power to issue economic decrees. This commission, which was given a free hand to interpret and modify existing trade regulations and to propose new laws for ratification by Sovnarkom, does not seem to have exerted itself in any substantial way, however, and market forces remained paramount under the NEP.

Despite the real limitations on central planning authority in a largely market-based economy, STO emerged as what historian Maurice Dobb has characterized as "the supreme executive body in the economic sphere, filling the role of an Economic General Staff which Vesenkha had aimed, but had failed, to fulfil in the earlier period."

Relationship to Gosplan

The State Committee for Planning (Gosudarstvennyi Komitet po Planirovaniiu, commonly called "Gosplan"), later all powerful in the Soviet economic firmament, was launched as a permanent advisory subcommittee of STO, assigned with the task of conducting detailed economic investigations and providing expert recommendations to the decision-making STO.

Throughout the NEP period the economic planning bureaucracy proliferated, with decision-makers of the economic trusts sometimes forced to deal with no fewer than four agencies — the Supreme Council of National Economy (Vesenkha), the People's Commissariat of Finance (Narkomfin), Gosplan, and STO. The system was inefficient and sometimes forced contradictory objectives upon firm managers, forcing the firms to produce reams of documents to satisfy bureaucratic overseers. In the event of fundamental disagreement between agencies, the decision of STO was decisive during the years of the late 1920s.

Periodicals

The Council of Labor and Defense had a daily newspaper, Ekonomicheskaya Zhizn''' (Economic Life). The paper was established in November 1918 as the organ of Vesenkha and was made the official voice of STO effective with the issue of August 2, 1921. Effective in January 1935 the paper was made into the official organ of the People's Commissariat of Finance and other institutions. Publication continued through 1937.

Chairmen 
Vladimir Ilyich Lenin (April 1920 - January 1924)
Lev Borisovich Kamenev (February 1924 - January 1926)
Alexei Ivanovich Rykov  (January 1926 - December 1930)
Vyacheslav Mikhailovich Molotov (December 1930 - April 1937)

See also

 Gosplan
 USSR State Defense Committee

Footnotes

Government of the Soviet Union
Government of Russia
1918 establishments in Russia
1937 disestablishments